The 1931 Ohio State Buckeyes football team was an American football team that represented Ohio State University during the 1931 college football season as a member of the Big Ten Conference. In their third year under head coach Sam Willaman, the team compiled an overall record of 6–3, with a mark of 4–2 in conference play.

Schedule

References

Ohio State
Ohio State Buckeyes football seasons
Ohio State Buckeyes football